Wálter Restrepo Uribe (born June 21, 1988) is an American-born Colombian football player.

Career

2006–2010
He played professionally in Colombia from 2006–2010, appearing in both the first and second division for Deportes Tolima, Boyacá Chicó and Expreso Rojo. He has also represented the Colombia national team at the U17 level.

Fort Lauderdale Strikers

2011
Retrepo signed with the Fort Lauderdale Strikers on July 11, 2011, midway through the 2011 NASL season. He made his debut for the Strikers in a 3–0 win against FC Edmonton on July 30. Restrepo scored his first goal for the Strikers in his first start with the club, beating Brad Knighton with a half-volley from 30 yards out. Restrepo's goal, along with the stoppage-time winner from Martin Nuñez in the same game, was voted by fans as the #1 play of 2011. Restrepo scored his second goal for the Strikers in the 3–1 victory against the Puerto Rico Islanders in the semifinal round of the playoffs. He ended his first season with the Strikers having made a total of twelve appearances in all competitions, scoring two goals and a single assist.

2012
In December 2011, the Strikers announced that they had picked up Restrepo's option for the 2012 season. He switched from the number 19 jersey to the iconic 10 shirt after Mike Palacio signed with the RailHawks. Restrepo began the season as the Strikers' main playmaker, occupying the hole behind the forwards. On April 21, he assisted both Andy Herron's goals in the 2–2 draw with the San Antonio Scorpions. A week later he scored his first goal of the season against rivals Tampa Bay Rowdies in the 90th minute of the 3–1 loss.

After the emergence of teammate Mark Anderson in the attacking midfield position, Restrepo moved to the right side of midfield. On July 7, Restrepo recorded his first multi-goal game, scoring twice against the RailHawks in a 3–3 draw at WakeMed Soccer Park. The Strikers extended Restrepo's contract on July 17 to carry through the 2013 season, with an option for 2014. On July 28 against the Atlanta Silverbacks, Restrepo scored his sixth goal of the season and extended his league-lead in assists from six to eight.

On August 15, the Strikers announced that Restrepo would miss the remainder of the season after suffering an ACL tear.

2013
Restrepo made his return from injury in the first match of the 2013 season on April 6—nearly 8 months after tearing his ACL. He replaced Rubens in the 65th minute to a rapturous applause, sparking a comeback 1–1 tie with FC Edmonton in his 25-minute cameo.

Restrepo forced what was later considered an own goal by the New York Cosmos in the 2014 NASL semi-final during extra-time. That goal would be the game winner and would send the eventual champions, San Antonio Scorpions, into the championship match.

New York Cosmos
On January 19, 2015, Restrepo signed with the New York Cosmos.

Philadelphia Union
On January 12, 2016, Restrepo signed with the Philadelphia Union for an undisclosed transfer fee. At the conclusion of the season, Restrepo's contract was declined by the Union after making 4 appearances for the club and 8 for its USL reserve team, Bethlehem Steel FC.

Return to New York Cosmos
On January 31, 2017, Restrepo re-signed with the New York Cosmos. Restrepo played 13 games for the Cosmos during the NASL's Spring Season, notching 2 goals and 2 assists.

Tampa Bay Rowdies
On July 20, he was released by New York in order to sign with the Tampa Bay Rowdies.

San Antonio FC
On November 20, 2018, USL side San Antonio FC announced the signing of Restropo.

Career statistics

Club
Statistics accurate as of August 15, 2012

References

External links
 Fort Lauderdale Strikers bio
 New York Cosmos bio
 NISL bio

1988 births
Living people
Colombian footballers
American soccer players
American sportspeople of Colombian descent
Boyacá Chicó F.C. footballers
Fort Lauderdale Strikers players
San Antonio Scorpions players
North American Soccer League players
New York Cosmos (2010) players
Philadelphia Union players
Philadelphia Union II players
Categoría Primera A players
USL Championship players
Major League Soccer players
Tampa Bay Rowdies players
Association football midfielders
San Antonio FC players